Amanda Stretton (née Cohn; born 24 July 1973, in London) is an English racing driver, broadcaster and motoring journalist.

Biography
The daughter of British automobile collector and historic racer Terry Cohn, she grew up in London and was educated at New Hall School in Essex. At age 13, she raced Motocross bikes.

In 2001 became the first ever female driver to compete in the ASCAR Mintex Cup where she finished in 6th place. In 2003, she entered the first ever female team in the British GT Championships, and was the first British female to race in the FIA Championships. In September 2004 she became the first British woman to win an international long distance event at Spa-Francorchamps, Belgium, beating her husband, a competitor. In 2006, she competed in the 24 Hours of Le Mans race.

Media career
Stretton was invited on to a television show to debate the proposal that "Women can't drive or race", and in light of her feisty and intellectual defence of women as drivers and her actual track record, was offered a position with Channel 4 to co-present their motorsports coverage under the title "Motorsport on 4" which included the British Formula 3, GT, MGF and Rally Championships, as well as the Anglo-American Stock Car Racing series and UK Supercross. She has also presented Channel 4’s Driven.

After Channel 4 lost the television rights to the majority of their motorsports events, Stretton presented most of the events for the new rights holders including Sky Sports, EuroSport, and Silverstone TV; and is one of the radio commentators for the American and European Le Mans Series. She also picked up presentation on non-motorsports events for the Travel Channel and NOW.com.

Stretton presented Channel 5's Dream Machine series, in which classic cars are restored or kit cars which replicate them are built; as well as UK Horror Homes. With Murray Walker she co-presented ITV1's coverage of the Goodwood Festival of Speed, the Goodwood Revival and The Goodwood Members Meeting for many years. Away from the track, she has presented "Wrecks to Riches" for Discovery Home & Leisure, is a freelance journalist and writes for a range of newspaper columns and specialist motoring titles. Stretton has been a brand spokesperson and presenter for Mercedes-Benz, Michelin and now the Panasonic Jaguar Racing Formula E Team.

Stretton is the motoring editor at Confused.com.

She is Patron of the Rhodesian Ridgeback Welfare Trust.

Personal life
Stretton has a daughter and a son, Mia and Marcus, and enjoys cooking.

24 Hours of Le Mans results

References

External links
Personal website
Bio at HistoricRacing.com
Bio at RacerChicks.com

1973 births
Living people
Sportspeople from London
English Jews
English racing drivers
Motorsport announcers
English television presenters
24 Hours of Le Mans drivers
American Le Mans Series drivers
European Le Mans Series drivers
People educated at New Hall School
English female racing drivers
British GT Championship drivers
Team West-Tec drivers